Breiavatnet is a small lake in the municipality of Stavanger in Rogaland county, Norway.  The  lake is very shallow, only a few feet deep. The lake gets its water from the Kannikbekken stream, which flows from the Mosvatnet lake and runs through the city (the stream was put mostly underground in culverts and pipes in 1899).  A decorative fountain was installed in the middle of the lake in 1924.

The lake lies in the city centre of Stavanger, on the border of the boroughs of Storhaug and Eiganes og Våland. The Stavanger Cathedral, the City Park, and Stavanger Cathedral School lie on the northern shore of the lake.  The Stavanger train station is located on the south shore of the lake.

The lake is the home of various birds, such as swans, seagulls, ducks, and sparrows. There are scarcely any fish in the water, and an old story from the area says that only the principal of Stavanger Cathedral School is the only one with rights to go fishing in Breiavatnet.

See also
List of lakes in Norway
Stavangerpark

References

Stavanger
Lakes of Rogaland